Brachinus pectoralis is a species of ground beetle in the Brachininae subfamily that can be found in Albania, Bulgaria, Corsica, Canary Islands, France, Greece, Hungary, Italy, Slovakia, Ukraine, southern part of Russia, European part of Turkey, and Spain. Besides European countries it can be found in Central Asian ones such as Armenia, Georgia, Kazakhstan, Kyrgyzstan, Tajikistan and Uzbekistan.

References

Beetles described in 1829
Beetles of Asia
Beetles of Europe
Brachininae